The Gran Queyron (in Italian) or Grand Queyron (in French) is a 3,060 metres high mountain of the Cottian Alps.

Toponymy 
In the Italian alpinistic and geographyc literature the mountain also appears as Gran Queyròn, Frapeyràs or Gran Zueyron.

Geography  
The peak is located on the French-Italian border between the Metropolitan City of Turin (Piedmont) and the French department of Hautes-Alpes (Provence-Alpes-Côte-d'Azur). It belongs to the Main chain of the Alps. Administratively the mountain is the tripoint where the Italian comunes of Sauze di Cesana (north-west face) and Prali (north-east face) meet with the French commune of Abriès (south face).

SOIUSA classification 
According to SOIUSA (International Standardized Mountain Subdivision of the Alps) the mountain can be classified in the following way:
 main part = Western Alps
 major sector =  South Western Alps
 section = Cottian Alps
 subsection = Central Cottian Alps	
 supergroup = 	Catena Bucie-Grand Queyron-Orsiera
 group = Queyron-Albergian-Sestrière
 subgroup = Grand Queyron-Vergia-Rognosa
 code = I/A-4.II-A.2.a

Access to the summit 

The summit of the Gran Queyron can be accessed starting from the village of Bout du Col (Prali) by marked footpaths with some hiking experience. Another way follows the Argentera valley from Bergeria del Gran Miôl, which can be accessed with a 4 wheel drive vehicle. From there the climb to the summit takes a little less than 2.5 hours's walk.

References

Maps
 Italian official cartography (Istituto Geografico Militare - IGM); on-line version: www.pcn.minambiente.it
 French  official cartography (Institut géographique national - IGN); on-line version:  www.geoportail.fr
 Istituto Geografico Centrale - Carta dei sentieri e dei rifugi scala 1:50.000 n. 1 Valli di Susa Chisone e Germanasca ''

External links

 

Mountains of the Alps
Mountains of Hautes-Alpes
Mountains of Piedmont
Alpine three-thousanders
France–Italy border
International mountains of Europe
Mountains partially in France